Undulambia lindbladi is a moth of the family Crambidae. It is found on the Galapagos Islands. The species has been recorded from fern covered habitats.

The forewings are dark brown with white and orange markings. The hindwings are usually white with dark brown and orange lines. However, there are darker specimens with dark brown hindwings with inconspicuous lines.

Larvae have been reared on Pteridium aquilinum var. arachnoideum. They mine the stem of their host plant.

References

External links

Moths described in 2006
Musotiminae